Community In A Cube (CIAC) is a housing development on Windward Way, Middlehaven of Middlesbrough, United Kingdom designed by Fashion Architecture Taste for clients BioRegional and Quintain.

References

Buildings and structures in Middlesbrough
Apartment buildings in England